Camfield is a surname. Notable people with the surname include:

Anne Camfield (1808–1896), Australian photographer, pioneer teacher and headmistress
Bill Camfield (1929–1991), American television personality
Douglas Camfield (1931–1984), British television director
Ian Camfield British radio presenter